The 2013 Nevada Wolf Pack football team represented the University of Nevada, Reno in the 2013 NCAA Division I FBS football season. The Wolf Pack were led by first–year head coach Brian Polian and played their home games at Mackay Stadium. They were members of the West Division of the Mountain West Conference. They finished the season 4–8 and 3–5 in Mountain West play to finish in fifth place in the West Division.

Preseason

Mountain West media days
The Mountain West media days were held on July 22–23, 2013, at the Cosmopolitan in Paradise, Nevada.

Media poll
The preseason poll was released on July 22, 2013. The Wolf Pack were predicted to finish in fourth place in the MW West Division.

Preseason All–Mountain West Team
The Wolf Pack had one player selected to the preseason All–Mountain West Team; one from the defense.

Defense

Brock Hekking – DL

Schedule

Personnel

Game summaries

at UCLA

UC Davis

at Florida State

Hawaii

Air Force

at San Diego State

at Boise State

UNLV

at Fresno State

at Colorado State

San Jose State

BYU

Players in the 2014 NFL Draft

References

Nevada
Nevada Wolf Pack football seasons
Nevada Wolf Pack football